David Lindsay, 9th Earl of Crawford (died 10 September 1558) was a Scottish peer and Member of Parliament.

First known as David Lindsay of Edzell, he inherited the earldom from David Lindsay, 8th Earl of Crawford by nomination. His second wife was Katherine Campbell, Countess of Crawford. They married before November 1550 and they had seven children.

He was succeeded as Earl of Crawford by the 8th Earl's grandson David Lindsay, 10th Earl of Crawford.

Family
He married, firstly, Janet Gray, daughter of Patrick Gray, Master of Gray, and Annabella Forbes, before 12 June 1535.

He married, secondly, in 1550 Katherine Campbell (d. 1578), widow of James Ogilvy, Master of Ogilvy and daughter of Sir John Campbell, 1st of Cawdor and Muriel Calde, in 1550. She had been a lady-in-waiting to Mary of Guise. Their children included:
 John Lindsay of Balcarres, Lord Menmuir.
 Sir David Lindsay of Edzell
 Walter Lindsay of Balgavie
 Elizabeth Lindsay (d. 1585), who married Patrick Drummond, 3rd Lord Drummond.
 Margaret Lindsay, who married John Stewart, 6th Lord Innermeath (d. 1603) who was made Earl of Atholl in 1596.

Katherine Campbell died at Brechin Castle in October 1578. Her will mentions a silver bowl bought for her in Paris when she was a companion of Mary of Guise. She left a bed of green stemming embroidered with black velvet and white silk to Sir David Lindsay of Edzell. She left a bed of cloth of gold with curtains of varying colour taffeta with fringes of crimson and yellow silk to Lord Ogilvy. To her daughter Margaret, she left a black velvet gown trimmed with ermine, with a purple damask skirt. She left to Helen Ogilvy, Lady Inverquharity younger, a daughter from her first marriage, 300 merks for her grandchildren. To her daughter Agnes Ogilvy, Lady Dun younger, a gold chained pledged for the lands of Inverquharity and black damask to make a new gown from fabric she had bought for clothes for herself.

Elizabeth Lindsay, Lady Drummond, her daughter, was to have her gold bracelets with white enamel work and a black velvet gown with borders of embroidered satin. Margaret Forbes, if she married, was to have 200 merks, and Katherine Campbell recommended that she be brought up by her sister Janet Campbell, Lady Lovat.

References

9
1558 deaths
David
Year of birth unknown
Lord Provosts of Dundee